Holovko is a gender-neutral Ukrainian surname. It may refer to

Oleksandr Holovko (born 1972), Ukrainian footballer
Oleksandr Holovko (footballer, born 1995), Ukrainian footballer
Mykhailo Holovko (born 1983), Ukrainian politician
Mykola Holovko (1937–2004), Ukrainian footballer and coach
Valeriy Holovko (born 1965), Ukrainian politician

See also
 
 Golovko

Ukrainian-language surnames